Glycymeris aspersa, common name the clothed bittersweet, is a species of saltwater clam, a marine bivalve mollusc in the family Glycymerididae, the bittersweets.

Description
Glycymeris aspersa has a shell that reaches a diameter of 36 – 46 mm. It is a sturdy shell, nearly circular in outline and rather flattened. It has mottled brown markings on a white background. The interior is white. In life the external surface is often partially clothed in a very dense brown periostracum.

Distribution
This species can be found in the East and South China Seas, as well as around Japan. It lives buried in sand or gravel.

References

World Wide Molluscs Species Database
Conchology
Encyclopedia of life
Ecosystems

External links
 

aspersa